"Sweat It Out" is a song written and recorded by Australian rock musician, Jimmy Barnes. Released in January 1993 as the lead single from his sixth studio album, Heat. The song peaked at number 11 on the ARIA charts.

Track listing
 CD Single (D11351)
 "Sweat It Out" - 3:59	
 "Tell Me the Truth" - 3:48	
 "Sitting in a Bar" - 3:59

Charts

References

Mushroom Records singles
1993 singles
1992 songs
Jimmy Barnes songs
Song recordings produced by Don Gehman
Songs written by Jimmy Barnes